Ban Phue is a district (amphoe) in the northwestern part of Udon Thani province, northeastern Thailand.

Geography
Neighboring districts are (from the north clockwise) Sangkhom, Pho Tak, Tha Bo, and Sakhrai of Nong Khai province, Phen, Mueang Udon Thani, and Kut Chap of Udon Thani Province, Suwannakhuha of Nong Bua Lamphu province, and Nam Som and Na Yung of Udon Thani.

Located within the district is the Phu Phra Bat Historical Park and the Phu Phra Bat Buabok Forest Park.

Administration
The district is divided into 13 sub-districts (tambons), which are further divided into 165 villages (mubans). Ban Phue is a sub-district municipality (thesaban tambon) which covers parts of tambon Ban Phue. There are a further 13 tambon administrative organizations (TAO).

References

External links
amphoe.com (Thai)

Ban Phue